Antonio Bulifon (1649-1707) was a French printer working in Naples. As a publisher Bulifon was "fundamentally important for the diffusion of women's poetry" in Italy.

Life
Antonio Bulifon was born in Chaponay in Dauphiné in southeastern France, the son of Laurent Bulifon, a notary, and his wife Jeanne Pros. In 1668 he set out on travels across France, visiting shrines in Marseilles, Toulon and Aix, and continuing to Rome on hearing of the death of Pope Clement IX. In 1670 he moved to Naples, where he established a printing firm. For his printer's device he chose a Siren, perhaps a symbol for his adopted city, and the motto “non sempre nuoce” (“she does not always harm”). As a printer Bulifon specialized in travel books, histories of the city, and sixteenth-century lyric poetry. He republished the fairy tales of Giambattista Basile.

Bulifon's wealth of contacts, coupled with his virtual monopoly on the sale of foreign journals and books in Naples, transformed his bookshop into the primary conduit through which information and texts flowed freely in and out of the city. Not surprisingly, Bulifon's bottega became a gathering place for Neapolitan intellectuals including Giuseppe Artale, Francesco D'Andrea, Niccolò Toppi, Pompeo Sarnelli, Giovanni Vincenzo Gravina and Carlo Celano. The centrality of Bulifon's bookshop to Neapolitan intellectual life led foreign visitors from France, Germany, Switzerland, and England to his door. His shop became a mandatory stop for anyone traveling to Naples, as satisfied customers returned home and began to advertise his services. For example, after a trip to Naples in 1688, the author of Nouveau voyage d'Italie (1691), Maximilien Misson, described the printer as follows: “Mr. Bulifon, a bookseller, a native of France, but established for a long time in Naples, is not only clever in his trade, but knows an infinity of things, is the author of many good books and an exceedingly honorable man. He is extremely courteous to travelers and always ready to offer them his good offices”. 

Bulifon gave particularly noteworthy attention to women's work. He republished the poetry of Vittoria Colonna in 1692 and 1693. Between 1692 and 1694 he also published the poems of Laura Terracina, Lucrezia Marinella, Veronica Gambara, Isabella Morra, Maria Selvaggia Borghini, Tullia d'Aragona, Laura Battiferri and Isabella Andreini, as well an anthology of fifty women poets. 

Around the start of the 18th century Bulifon turned his printing business over to his son Niccolo. When the Austrians invaded Naples in 1707, he fled to Spain and sought the protection of Philip V. His Naples bookshop was attacked and destroyed by a mob, and he died later that year.

Works

Works published by Bulifon
 Lo cunto de li cunti by Giambattista Basile, ed. Pompeo Sarnelli. Naples, 1674.
 Guida de forestieri: curiosi di vedere, e d'intendere le cose più notabili della regal cittá di Napoli, e del suo amenissimo distretto by Pompeo Sarnelli. Naples, 1683.
 Rime di M. Vittoria Colonna d'Avalo. Naples, 1692.

References

External links 
 

1649 births
1707 deaths
Italian publishers (people)
Italian printers
17th-century Neapolitan people